Cassava American latent virus (CsAlV) is a plant pathogenic virus of the family Secoviridae.

External links
ICTVdB—The Universal Virus Database: Cassava American latent virus
Family Groups—The Baltimore Method

Viral plant pathogens and diseases
Nepoviruses